RED C is a market research and polling company in Ireland.

It is most widely known for its political opinion polling (though most of its business is market research, with several large corporate clients). The Sunday Business Post publishes a monthly RED C poll tracking the support for Irish political parties.

RED C was founded in 2003 by CEO Richard Colwell who had previously worked in London for Research International and ICM Research, followed by Lansdowne Market Research in Dublin. As at 2016, Red C Research and Marketing Ltd was owned (via holding company RSV Ventures Ltd) by its directors, with Colwell being the majority shareholder.

The company’s headquarters are in East Point Business Park in Dublin. The company opened a call centre in Dundalk in 2006, and a London office in 2016.

References

External links
 redcresearch.ie – RED C’s website

Irish companies established in 2003
Market research companies of Ireland
Opinion polling in the Republic of Ireland
Public opinion research companies
Research in Ireland
Service companies of the Republic of Ireland